Blanca (meaning "white" in Spanish) may refer to:

Locations

United States
Casa Blanca, California or Blanca, a former unincorporated community
Blanca, Colorado, a Statutory Town 
Blanca Peak, a mountain in Colorado
Blanca Wetlands, a protected area in Colorado
La Blanca, Texas, a census-designated place
one of many early names of Galveston Island, Texas - see History of Galveston, Texas
Blanca Lake, a lake in Washington

Elsewhere
La Blanca, an archeological site in Guatemala
Blanca, Sevnica, a settlement in Slovenia
Blanca, Murcia, a town in Spain
Isla Blanca (disambiguation)

People
 Blanca (given name)
 Nida Blanca (1936–2001), Filipina actress
 Blanca (musician), a contemporary Christian music artist

Other uses
 Blanca (album), by Christian musician Blanca
 Blanca, a 1971 film by Walerian Borowczyk

See also
Blanco (disambiguation)
Blanch (disambiguation)
Blanche (disambiguation)
Blanka (disambiguation)
Hurricane Blanca, a list of tropical cyclones
Laguna Blanca (disambiguation)
Sierra Blanca (disambiguation)